Judy Gegan (born 10 November 1944) is a British former swimmer.

Swimming career
She competed in the women's 100 metre butterfly at the 1964 Summer Olympics.

She represented England in the 110 yards butterfly at the 1962 British Empire and Commonwealth Games in Perth, Australia.

Four years later she represented England again and won a gold medal and silver medal in the 440 yards medley relay and the 110 yards butterfly respectively, at the 1966 British Empire and Commonwealth Games in Kingston, Jamaica.

References

1944 births
Living people
British female swimmers
Olympic swimmers of Great Britain
Swimmers at the 1964 Summer Olympics
People from Romford
Sportspeople from London
Commonwealth Games medallists in swimming
Commonwealth Games gold medallists for England
Commonwealth Games silver medallists for England
Swimmers at the 1966 British Empire and Commonwealth Games
20th-century British women
Medallists at the 1966 British Empire and Commonwealth Games